Plum Lake is a lake in Jackson County, in the U.S. state of Minnesota.

Plum Lake was named for the wild plum trees on its lake island.

See also
List of lakes in Minnesota

References

Lakes of Minnesota
Lakes of Jackson County, Minnesota